In mathematics, the directional derivative of a multivariable differentiable (scalar) function along a given vector v at a given point x intuitively represents the instantaneous rate of change of the function, moving through x with a velocity specified by v.  

The directional derivative of a scalar function f with respect to a vector v at a point (e.g., position) x may be denoted by any of the following:

It therefore generalizes the notion of a partial derivative, in which the rate of change is taken along one of the curvilinear coordinate curves, all other coordinates being constant.
The directional derivative is a special case of the Gateaux derivative.

Definition 

The directional derivative of a scalar function 

along a vector

is the function  defined by the limit

This definition is valid in a broad range of contexts, for example where the norm of a vector (and hence a unit vector) is undefined.

For differentiable functions 

If the function f is differentiable at x, then the directional derivative exists along any unit vector v at x, and one has

This follows from defining a path  and using the definition of the derivative as a limit which can be calculated along this path to get:

Intuitively, the directional derivative of f at a point x represents the rate of change of f, in the direction of v with respect to time, when moving past x.

Using only direction of vector 

In a Euclidean space, some authors define the directional derivative to be with respect to an arbitrary nonzero vector v after normalization, thus being independent of its magnitude and depending only on its direction.

In this case, one has

or in case f is differentiable at x,

Restriction to a unit vector 

In the context of a function on a Euclidean space, some texts restrict the vector v to being a unit vector.  With this restriction, both the above definitions are equivalent.

Properties 
Many of the familiar properties of the ordinary derivative hold for the directional derivative.  These include, for any functions f and g defined in a neighborhood of, and differentiable at, p: 

 sum rule: 
 constant factor rule: For any constant c, 
 product rule (or Leibniz's rule): 
 chain rule: If g is differentiable at p and h is differentiable at g(p), then

In differential geometry 

Then the directional derivative is defined by

The Lie derivative
The Lie derivative of a vector field  along a vector field  is given by the difference of two directional derivatives (with vanishing torsion):

In particular, for a scalar field , the Lie derivative reduces to the standard directional derivative:

The Riemann tensor
Directional derivatives are often used in introductory derivations of the Riemann curvature tensor. Consider a curved rectangle with an infinitesimal vector  along one edge and  along the other. We translate a covector  along  then  and then subtract the translation along  and then . Instead of building the directional derivative using partial derivatives, we use the covariant derivative.

The difference between the two paths is then

It can be argued that the noncommutativity of the covariant derivatives measures the curvature of the manifold:

where  is the Riemann curvature tensor and the sign depends on the sign convention of the author.

In group theory

Translations
In the Poincaré algebra, we can define an infinitesimal translation operator P as

(the i ensures that P is a self-adjoint operator) For a finite displacement λ, the unitary Hilbert space representation for translations is 

By using the above definition of the infinitesimal translation operator, we see that the finite translation operator is an exponentiated directional derivative:

This is a translation operator in the sense that it acts on multivariable functions f(x) as

Rotations
The rotation operator also contains a directional derivative.

Here L is the vector operator that generates SO(3):

It may be shown geometrically that an infinitesimal right-handed rotation changes the position vector x by

So we would expect under infinitesimal rotation:

It follows that 

Following the same exponentiation procedure as above, we arrive at the rotation operator in the position basis, which is an exponentiated directional derivative:

Normal derivative 

A normal derivative is a directional derivative taken in the direction normal (that is, orthogonal) to some surface in space, or more generally along a normal vector field orthogonal to some hypersurface. See for example Neumann boundary condition. In other notations,

In the continuum mechanics of solids 

Several important results in continuum mechanics require the derivatives of vectors with respect to vectors and of tensors with respect to vectors and tensors.  The directional directive provides a systematic way of finding these derivatives.

See also

Notes

References

External links 

Directional derivatives at MathWorld.
Directional derivative at PlanetMath.

Differential calculus
Differential geometry
Generalizations of the derivative
Multivariable calculus
Scalars
Rates